Beware of Married Men is a 1928 American comedy film directed by Archie Mayo and starring Irene Rich, Clyde Cook and Audrey Ferris. It was produced and distributed by Warner Brothers with a Vitaphone track.

The film is presumed lost save for a one reel [4th reel] fragment extant at UCLA Film and Television Archive.

Cast
 Irene Rich as Myra Martin  
 Clyde Cook as Botts  
 Audrey Ferris as Helene Martin  
 Myrna Loy as Juanita Sheldon  
 Richard Tucker as Leonard Gilbert  
 Stuart Holmes as Huntley Sheldon  
 Hugh Allan as Ralph

References

External links
 

1928 films
1928 comedy films
1920s English-language films
Silent American comedy films
Films directed by Archie Mayo
Warner Bros. films
American black-and-white films
Lost American films
Lost comedy films
American silent feature films
1928 lost films
1920s American films